Bret Cooper (born December 16, 1970) is a former American football player who played twelve seasons in the Arena Football League (AFL) with the Tampa Bay Storm, Memphis Pharaohs, San Jose SaberCats, Orlando Predators, Buffalo Destroyers and Georgia Force. He played college football at the University of Central Florida and attended Miami Killian High School in Miami, Florida.

Professional career
Cooper played for the Tampa Bay Storm of the AFL in 1994. He played for the AFL's Memphis Pharaohs from 1995 to 1996. He played for the San Jose SaberCats of the AFL in 1997. Cooper played for the Orlando Predators of the AFL from 1998 to 2001, earning First Team All-Arena honors in 2000. He was released by the Predators on November 15, 2001. He signed with the AFL's Buffalo Destroyers on January 24, 2002. Cooper was released by the Destroyers on March 4, 2003. He was signed by the Georgia Force of the AFL on March 13, 2003. He signed with the Orlando Predators on October 22, 2003.

References

External links
Just Sports Stats

Living people
1970 births
Players of American football from Miami
American football wide receivers
American football defensive backs
UCF Knights football players
Tampa Bay Storm players
Memphis Pharaohs players
San Jose SaberCats players
Orlando Predators players
Buffalo Destroyers players
Georgia Force players
Miami Killian Senior High School alumni